Scopula leucoloma is a moth of the family Geometridae. It was described by Prout in 1932. It is endemic to Madagascar.

Subspecies
Scopula leucoloma leucoloma
Scopula leucoloma altimontana Herbulot, 1972
Scopula leucoloma permutans Herbulot, 1972

References

Moths described in 1932
Taxa named by Louis Beethoven Prout
leucoloma
Moths of Madagascar
Moths of Africa
Endemic fauna of Madagascar